Muriel Sutherland Snowden (July 14, 1916 – September 30, 1988) was the founder and co-director of Freedom House, a community improvement center in Roxbury, Massachusetts.  She is, together with her husband Otto P. Snowden, a major figure in Boston history and activism.

Early life
Snowden was born Muriel Sophronia Sutherland and raised in Glen Ridge, New Jersey. She graduated as valedictorian of her high school in 1934. She attended Radcliffe College, graduating in 1938. 
She then worked as a volunteer for a settlement house in Newark and an investigator for the Essex County Welfare Board. She also studied at the New York School of Social Work from 1943-1945 and funded her education with a fellowship from the National Urban League. She married Otto P. Snowden in 1944, and they moved to Boston. Gail Snowden, their only child, was born in 1945.

Freedom House
The Snowdens founded Freedom House, an organization that advocated for self-help and integration for African Americans in Boston's Roxbury neighborhood, in 1949. After operating Freedom House out of their home for three years, the Snowdens purchased a building that previously housed the Hebrew Teachers College on Crawford Street in Roxbury to serve as its permanent location. Freedom House became a well-known and active advocacy organization in Upper Roxbury, at times even known as the "Black Pentagon" because it was the major meeting spot for Boston's African-American activist community. Speaking of her family's commitment to living in the Roxbury neighborhood in an era when it suffered from blight, arson, and other crime, Muriel Snowden once said "We decided long ago we weren't going anywhere, and we were going to stay here ... This is a commitment. You have a direction, a feeling about where you're going." Muriel and Otto Snowden retired from active involvement in Freedom House in 1984; their daughter Gail later became chair of the Foundation's board.

Other work
Snowden served as executive director of the Cambridge Civic Unity Committee from 1948 to 1950, until she left to dedicate her full-time to Freedom House. She also taught community organization at the Simmons College School of Social Work as an adjunct instructor from 1958 to 1970. Snowden served on the boards of many organizations, including University of Massachusetts Amherst, the Associated Harvard Alumni, the Radcliffe College Alumnae Association, Babson College, Shawmut Bank, the board of overseers of Harvard College, and the Racial Imbalance Committee of the Massachusetts Department of Education.

Awards
 MacArthur Fellowship (1987) 
 Harvard Medal (1986) 
 Honorary doctorate, University of Massachusetts (1968)
 Alumnae Achievement Award, Radcliffe College (1964)

Death and legacy
Snowden died from cancer at the age of 72, on September 30, 1988.

The Snowden International School, near Copley Square in Boston, credits her for their international-themed curriculum and is named after her.
Her papers are held at Northeastern University as part of the Freedom House Collection in its Library Archives and Special Collections Department.

References

External links
Snowden International School
"Reminiscences of Muriel S. Snowden", Columbia University

People from Glen Ridge, New Jersey
Radcliffe College alumni
MacArthur Fellows
American social workers
1916 births
1988 deaths
African-American history in Boston
Activists for African-American civil rights
Columbia University School of Social Work alumni
20th-century African-American women
20th-century African-American people
Women civil rights activists